VUK or Vuk may refer to:

Vuk (computer), Yugoslavian computer prototype
Vuk (film), an animated Hungarian movie
Vuk (novel), a 1965 novel by Istvan Fekete
Vuk (name), Slavic given name
 Vuk, Ban of Bosnia
VUK-T (glider), often called VUK, a high-performance Yugoslavian sailplane
Vojvoda Vuk, Chetnik voivoda (duke)
Vuk Stefanović Karadžić (1787–1864), Serbian language reformer and folklorist, often referred to simply as Vuk
 Vukićević
Volume Unique Key in the AACS, encryption system
Value Up Kit
Vuk, a character in the 2019 film Dark Phoenix
Vertical up-kicker, a pinball part